Michael David Tudor Roberts (born 13 March 1989) is an English cricketer. Roberts is a right-handed batsman who bowls right-arm off break. He was born at Oxford, Oxfordshire, and was educated at The Oratory School, before attending the University of Bath.

Roberts made his debut in county cricket for Berkshire against Dorset in the 2006 Minor Counties Championship. It wouldn't be until 2009 that he would appear again for the county in Minor counties cricket. To date he has appeared in thirteen Minor Counties Championship and six MCCA Knockout Trophy matches. During this time he also played Second XI cricket for both Middlesex and Hampshire. During the 2011 season, while playing for Berkshire in the Minor Counties Championship against Herefordshire, Roberts and Jono McLean combined to set the highest ever partnership for the county – 371. In 2012, he was selected to play for the Unicorns in the 2012 Clydesdale Bank 40, making his List A debut in the competition against Derbyshire. Opening the batting for the Unicorns, Roberts made 4 runs before he was dismissed by Tim Groenewald.

On 4 October 2012 Roberts was offered a full contract by Hampshire after excelling in the Second XI team during the 2012 season scoring 610 runs at an average of 58.10. He made his first-class debut for the county the following season against Loughborough MCCU.

References

External links
Michael Roberts at ESPNcricinfo
Michael Roberts at CricketArchive

1989 births
Living people
Cricketers from Oxford
People educated at The Oratory School
Alumni of the University of Bath
English cricketers
Berkshire cricketers
Unicorns cricketers
Hampshire cricketers